Donald Nicholson-Smith is a translator and freelance editor, interested in literature, art, psychoanalysis, social criticism, theory, history, crime fiction, and cinema. Born in Manchester, England, he was an early translator of Situationist material into English. He joined the English section of the Situationist International in 1965 and was expelled in December 1967. He lives in New York City.

Translations
Nicole Claveloux, The Green Hand and Other Stories, New York Review Books (2017)
Abdellatif Laabi, In Praise of Defeat, Archipelago Books, 2016. (shortlisted for the 2017 Griffin Poetry Prize)
Gianfranco Sanguinetti, Money, sex and power: on a sham biography of Guy Debord, cipM, 2016.
Jean-Paul Clébert, Paris Vagabond, New York Review Books, 2016.
Jean-Patrick Manchette, The Mad and the Bad, New York Review Books, 2014. 
_. Fatale, New York Review Books, 2011.
Guy Debord and Alice Becker-Ho, A Game of War, Atlas Press, 2007.
Antonin Artaud. 50 Drawings to Murder Magic, Seagull Books, 2008.
Guy Debord. The Society of the Spectacle, Zone, 1994.
_. A Sick Planet, Seagull Books, 2008.
Anselm Jappe. Guy Debord, University of California Press, 1999.
Thierry Jonquet. Mygale, City Lights, 2003.
_. Tarantula, Serpent's Tail, 2005.
Laplanche & Pontalis. The Language of Psychoanalysis, Norton, 1974.
Henri Lefebvre. The Production of Space, Blackwell, 1991.
Jean-Patrick Manchette. Three to Kill, City Lights, 2002.
Paco Ignacio Taibo II. 68, Seven Stories, 2004.
Raoul Vaneigem. The Revolution of Everyday Life, Rebel Press, 2003.
_. A Cavalier History of Surrealism, AK Press, 1999.

Articles
  Also published at pp. 467–488 of book Tom McDonough (2004) (Editor) Guy Debord and the Situationist International: Texts and Documents.  The MIT Press (April 1, 2004) 514 pages  
(2004) Black glove/white glove: revisiting Mexico's 1968

Notes

Translators from Spanish
Translators from French
Translators to English
British translators
Situationists
Living people
Year of birth missing (living people)